District Central Karachi is an administrative district of Karachi Division in Sindh, Pakistan.

History 
The District was abolished in 2000 and divided into four towns namely Liaquatabad Town, North Nazimabad Town, Gulberg Town and New Karachi Town.

On 11 July 2011 Sindh Government restored Karachi Central District again.

Karachi Central District has the following dehs: Gujhro (P), in the talukas of Liaquatabad and Gulberg, and Kari Lakhi, in the taluka of North Nazimabad.

In 2022, it was divided into five towns namely Liaquatabad Town, North Nazimabad Town, Gulberg Town, New Karachi Town and Nazimabad Town respectively.

Union Committees 
The following is a list of the union councils of Karachi Central, and their respective neighbourhoods and suburban localities. Karachi Central has a total of 5 Towns, and 45 Union councils.

Gulberg Town

Liaquatabad Town

New Karachi Town

North Nazimabad Town

Nazimabad Town

Demographics
At the time of the 2017 census, Karachi Central district had a population of 2,971,382, of which 1,542,028 were males and 1,428,860 females. The entire population was urban. The literacy rate is 81.52%: 81.90% for males and 81.13% for females.

The majority religion is Islam, with 98.31% of the population. Christianity is practiced by 1.22% of the population.

At the time of the 2017 census, 70.77% of the population spoke Urdu, 6.57% Punjabi, 5.53% Pashto, 5.44% Saraiki, 2.57% Sindhi and 1.41% Hindko as their first language.

References

 
Districts of Sindh
Districts of Karachi